"Sittin' in the Lap of Luxury" is a song co-written and performed by American singer Louie Louie, issued as the lead single from his debut studio album The State I'm In. The song was his only top 40 hit on the Billboard Hot 100, peaking at number 19 in 1990.

Music video

The official music video for "Sittin' in the Lap of Luxury" was directed by Michael Bay.

Charts

References

1990 songs
1990 singles
Epic Records singles
Louie Louie (musician) songs
Music videos directed by Michael Bay